Terry Ray (born October 12, 1969) is a Belgian-American former gridiron football safety and linebacker who played in both the National Football League (NFL) and the Canadian Football League (CFL) between 1992 and 2004.

NFL career
Ray was drafted out of the University of Oklahoma in the 6th round, 158th overall, by the Atlanta Falcons of the NFL in the 1992 NFL Draft. After playing in 10 games with Atlanta, Ray joined the New England Patriots and under new head coach Bill Parcells for the 1993 NFL season. Ray played with the Patriots until the 1996 NFL season, a season in which the Patriots lost to the Green Bay Packers in Super Bowl XXXI.

CFL career
Ray left the NFL after the 1996 season. Following two years out of football, Ray moved to the Canadian Football League (CFL), where he signed with the Edmonton Eskimos on May 12, 1999. In Canada, Ray became a four-time all star. Ray was released by the Eskimos prior to the 2003 CFL season in favor of Singor Mobley. Expected to sign with another CFL team, Ray signed with the Winnipeg Blue Bombers for the 2004 CFL season. After the 2004 season, Ray retired.

Scouting career
From 2005-08, Ray was a scout with the Washington Redskins in the NFL.

References

1969 births
Living people
American football defensive backs
Atlanta Falcons players
Canadian football linebackers
Edmonton Elks players
New England Patriots players
Oklahoma Sooners football players
Winnipeg Blue Bombers players